Monidigah (also, Mondygya and Monidigya) is a village and municipality in the Lerik Rayon of Azerbaijan. It has a population of 1,183.  The municipality consists of the villages of Monidigah, Pendi, and Jindi.

Mondigo 

Populated places in Lerik District